McDonnell Douglas was a major American aerospace manufacturing corporation and defense contractor, formed by the merger of McDonnell Aircraft and the Douglas Aircraft Company in 1967. Between then and its own merger with Boeing in 1997, it produced well-known commercial and military aircraft, such as the DC-10 and the MD-80 airliners, the F-15 Eagle air superiority fighter, and the F/A-18 Hornet multirole fighter.

The corporation's headquarters were at St. Louis Lambert International Airport, near St. Louis, Missouri.

History

Background

The company was formed from the firms of James Smith McDonnell and Donald Wills Douglas in 1967. Both men were of Scottish ancestry, were graduates of the Massachusetts Institute of Technology, and had worked for the aircraft manufacturer Glenn L. Martin Company.
 

Douglas had been chief engineer at Martin before leaving to establish Davis-Douglas Company in early 1920 in Los Angeles. The following year, he bought out his backer and renamed the firm the Douglas Aircraft Company. 

McDonnell founded J.S. McDonnell & Associates in Milwaukee, Wisconsin, in 1926 to produce a personal aircraft for family use. The economic depression from 1929 ruined his ideas and the company collapsed. He worked at three companies, joining Glenn Martin Company in 1933. He left Martin in 1938 to try again with his own firm, McDonnell Aircraft Corporation, this time based at Lambert Field, outside St. Louis, Missouri.

Douglas Aircraft profited during World War II. The company produced about 10,000 C-47s, a military variant of the Douglas DC-3, from 1942 to 1945. The workforce swelled to 160,000.

Both companies suffered at the end of the war, facing an end of government orders and a surplus of aircraft. Douglas continued to develop new aircraft, including the DC-6 in 1946 and the DC-7 in 1953. The company moved into jet propulsion, producing the F3D Skyknight in 1948 and then the more "jet age" F4D Skyray in 1951. In 1955, Douglas introduced the U.S. Navy's first attack jet, the A4D Skyhawk. Designed to operate from the decks of the World War II s, the Skyhawk was small, reliable, and tough. Variants of it continued in use in the Navy for almost 50 years, finally serving in large numbers in a two-seat version as a jet trainer.

Douglas also made commercial jets, producing the DC-8 in 1958 to compete with the Boeing 707. McDonnell was also developing jets, but being smaller it was prepared to be more radical, building on its successful FH-1 Phantom to become a major supplier to the Navy with the F2H Banshee and F3H Demon; and producing the F-101 Voodoo for the United States Air Force (USAF). The Korean War-era Banshee and later the F-4 Phantom II produced during the Vietnam War helped push McDonnell into a major military fighter supply role. Douglas created a series of experimental high-speed jet aircraft in the Skyrocket family, with the Skyrocket DB-II being the first aircraft to travel at twice the speed of sound in 1953.

Both companies were eager to enter the new missile business, Douglas moving from producing air-to-air rockets and missiles to entire missile systems under the 1956 Nike program and becoming the main contractor of the Skybolt ALBM program and the Thor ballistic missile program. McDonnell made a number of missiles, including the unusual ADM-20 Quail, as well as experimenting with hypersonic flight, research that enabled it to gain a substantial share of the NASA projects Mercury and Gemini. Douglas also gained contracts from NASA, notably for part of the enormous Saturn V rocket.

The two companies were now major employers, but both were having problems. McDonnell was primarily a defense contractor, without any significant civilian business. It frequently suffered lean times during downturns in military procurement. Meanwhile, Douglas was strained by the cost of the DC-8 and DC-9. The two companies began to sound each other out about a merger in 1963. Douglas offered bid invitations from December 1966 and accepted that of McDonnell. The two firms were officially merged on April 28, 1967 as the McDonnell Douglas Corporation (MDC). Earlier, McDonnell bought 1.5 million shares of Douglas stock to help its partner meet "immediate financial requirements." The two companies seemed to be a good fit for each other. McDonnell's military contracts provided an instant solution for Douglas' cash flow problems, while the revenue from Douglas' civil contracts would be more than enough for McDonnell to withstand peacetime declines in procurement.

Formation

McDonnell Douglas retained McDonnell Aircraft's headquarters location at what was then known as Lambert–St. Louis International Airport, in Berkeley, Missouri, near St. Louis. James McDonnell became executive chairman and CEO of the merged company, with Donald Douglas Sr. as honorary chairman.

In 1967, with the merger of McDonnell and Douglas Aircraft, David S. Lewis, then president of McDonnell Aircraft, was named chairman of what was called the Long Beach, Douglas Aircraft Division. At the time of the merger, Douglas Aircraft was estimated to be less than a year from bankruptcy. Flush with orders, the DC-8 and DC-9 aircraft were 9 to 18 months behind schedule, incurring stiff penalties from the airlines. Lewis was active in DC-10 sales in an intense competition with Lockheed's L-1011, a rival tri-jet aircraft. In two years, Lewis had the operation back on track and in positive cash flow. He returned to the company's St. Louis headquarters where he continued sales efforts on the DC-10 and managed the company as a whole as President and chief operating officer through 1971.

The DC-10 began production in 1968 with the first deliveries in 1971. Several artists impressions exist of an aircraft named the "DC-10 Twin" or DC-X which McDonnell Douglas considered in the early 1970s but never built. This would have been an early twinjet similar to the later Airbus A300, but never progressed to a prototype. This could have given McDonnell Douglas an early lead in the huge twinjet market that subsequently developed, as well as commonality with much of the DC-10's systems.

1970–1980

In 1977, the next generation of DC-9 variants, dubbed the "Super 80" (later renamed the MD-80) series, was launched.

In 1977, the KC-10 Extender was the second McDonnell Douglas transport aircraft to be selected for use by the US Air Force; the first being the C-9 Nightingale/Skytrain II.

Through the years of the Cold War McDonnell Douglas had introduced and manufactured dozens of successful military aircraft, including the F-15 Eagle in 1974, the F/A-18 Hornet in 1978, and other products such as the Harpoon and Tomahawk missiles. The oil crisis of the 1970s was a serious shock to the commercial aviation industry, as a major manufacturer of commercial aircraft at the time, McDonnell Douglas was hit by the economic shift and forced to contract heavily while diversifying into new areas to reduce the impact of potential future downturns.

1980–1989

In 1984, McDonnell Douglas expanded into helicopters by purchasing Hughes Helicopters from the Summa Corporation for $470 million. Hughes Helicopters was made a subsidiary initially and renamed McDonnell Douglas Helicopter Systems in August 1984. McDonnell Douglas Helicopters's most successful product was the Hughes-designed AH-64 Apache attack helicopter.

In 1986, MD-11 was launched, an improved and upgraded version of DC-10. The MD-11 was the most advanced trijet aircraft to be developed. It sold 200 units, but was discontinued in 2001 after the merger with Boeing as it competed with the Boeing 777. The final commercial aircraft design to be made by McDonnell Douglas came in 1988. The MD-90 was a stretched version of the MD-80, equipped with International Aero Engines V2500 turbofans, the largest rear-mounted engines ever on a commercial jet. The MD-95, a modern regional airliner closely resembling the DC-9-30, was the last McDonnell Douglas designed commercial jet produced.

On January 13, 1988, McDonnell Douglas and General Dynamics won the US Navy Advanced Tactical Aircraft (ATA) contract. The US$4.83 billion contract was to develop the A-12 Avenger II, a stealth, carrier-based, long-range flying wing attack aircraft that would replace the A-6 Intruder.

In January 1989, Robert Hood, Jr was appointed President to lead the Douglas Aircraft Division, replacing retiring President Jim Worsham. McDonnell Douglas then introduced a major reorganization called the Total Quality Management System (TQMS). TQMS ended the functional setup where engineers with specific expertise in aerodynamics, structural mechanics, materials, and other technical areas worked on several different aircraft. This was replaced by a product-oriented system where they focus on one specific airplane. As part of reorganization, 5,000 managerial and supervisory positions were eliminated at Douglas. The former managers could apply for 2,800 newly created posts; the remaining 2,200 would lose their managerial responsibilities. The reorganization reportedly led to widespread loss of morale at the company and TQMS was nicknamed "Time to Quit and Move to Seattle" by employees referring to the competitor Boeing headquartered in Seattle, Washington.

1990–1997
Technical issues, development cost overruns, growing unit costs, and delays led to the termination of the A-12 Avenger II program on January 13, 1991, by Defense Secretary Dick Cheney. Years of litigation would proceed over the contract's termination: the government claimed that the contractors had defaulted on the contract and were not entitled to the final progress payments, while McDonnell Douglas and General Dynamics believed that the contract was terminated out of convenience, and thus the money was owed. The case was contested through litigation until a settlement was reached in January 2014. The chaos and financial stress created by the collapse of the A-12 program led to the layoff of 5,600 employees. The advanced tactical aircraft role vacated by the A-12 debacle would be filled by another McDonnell Douglas program, the F/A-18E/F Super Hornet. 

However the purchasing of aircraft was curtailed as the Cold War came to an abrupt end in the 1990s. This curtailment in military procurements combined with the loss of the contracts for two major projects, the Advanced Tactical Fighter and Joint Strike Fighter, severely hurt McDonnell Douglas. McDonnell Douglas built only a small wind tunnel test model. At its peak in mid-1990, McDonnell Douglas employed 132,500 people, but  dropped to about 87,400 by the end of 1992.

In 1991, MD-11 was not quite a success; ongoing tests of the MD-11 revealed a significant shortfall in the aircraft's performance. An important prospective carrier, Singapore Airlines, required a fully laden aircraft that could fly from Singapore to Paris, against strong headwinds during mid-winter; the MD-11 did not have sufficient range for this at the time. Due to the less-than-expected performance figures, Singapore Airlines cancelled its 20-aircraft MD-11 order on August 2, 1991, and ordered 20 A340-300s instead.

In 1992, McDonnell Douglas unveiled a study of a double deck jumbo-sized aircraft designated MD-12. Despite briefly leaving the market, the study was perceived as merely a public relations exercise to disguise the fact that MDC was struggling under intense pressure from Boeing and Airbus. It was clear to most in the industry that MDC had neither the resources nor the money to develop such a large aircraft, and the study quickly sank without a trace. A similar double deck concept was used in Boeing's later Ultra-Large Aircraft study intended to replace the 747, but ultimately the double deck concept would not see the light of day until the Airbus A380 in the 2000s.

Following Boeing's 1996 acquisition of Rockwell's North American division, McDonnell Douglas merged with Boeing in August 1997 in a US$13 billion stock swap, with Boeing as the surviving company. Boeing introduced a new corporate identity based on the McDonnell Douglas logo, which showed the globe being encircled in tribute to the first aerial circumnavigation which was accomplished in 1924 by Douglas aircraft. It was designed by graphic designer Rick Eiber, who has been the corporate identity consultant for Boeing over ten years.

Starting August 17, 2006, Boeing closed down the Long Beach factory as orders for the C-17 ceased.

McDonnell Automation Company legacy
Some of the company's lasting legacies are non-aviation related. They are the computer systems and companies developed in the company's subsidiary McDonnell Automation Company (McAuto) which was created in the 1950s initially used for numerical control for production starting in 1958 and computer-aided design (CAD) starting in 1959. Its CAD program MicroGDS remains in use with the latest official version 11.3 issued in June 2013.

By the 1970s, McAuto had 3,500 employees and $170 million worth of computer equipment. This made it one of the largest computer processors in the world during this era.

In 1981, McAuto acquired Bradford Systems and Administrative Services for $11.5 million and began processing medical claims. In 1983, two principals of Bradford who had to come work at McAuto—Joseph T. Lynaugh and Howard L. Waltman—formed the Sanus Corporation, a health maintenance organization that was a wholly owned subsidiary of McDonnell Douglas. In 1986, after McDonnell Douglas reduced its control, Sanus announced a partnership with St. Louis pharmacy chain Medicare-Glaser Corp. to form Express Scripts to provide drugs for the Sanus HMO.

Products

Military airplanes

McDonnell Douglas A-4 Skyhawk (started under Douglas Aircraft, used by the Blue Angels)
McDonnell Douglas A-4G Skyhawk
Project Kahu
McDonnell Douglas F-4 Phantom II (started under McDonnell Aircraft, used by the Blue Angels and Thunderbirds)
List of McDonnell Douglas F-4 Phantom II variants
McDonnell Douglas C-9
McDonnell Douglas F-15 Eagle
McDonnell Douglas F-15E Strike Eagle
McDonnell Douglas F-15 STOL/MTD
McDonnell Douglas AV-8B Harrier II (based on the British Aerospace Harrier)
McDonnell Douglas F/A-18 Hornet (used by the Blue Angels)
McDonnell Douglas CF-18 Hornet
High Alpha Research Vehicle
McDonnell Douglas YC-15
McDonnell Douglas T-45 Goshawk jet trainer (based on the British Aerospace Hawk)
McDonnell Douglas KC-10 Extender
McDonnell Douglas C-17 Globemaster III (Design and early production)
McDonnell Douglas A-12 Avenger II
F/A-18E/F Super Hornet (Initial design and early production)

Commercial airplanes
McDonnell Douglas DC-8 (started under Douglas Aircraft)
McDonnell Douglas DC-9 (started under Douglas Aircraft)
McDonnell Douglas DC-10 (with cockpit upgrade designated MD-10)
DC-10 Air Tanker
McDonnell Douglas MD-11 (stretched and modernized version of the DC-10)
McDonnell Douglas MD-80 (stretched and modernized version of the DC-9)
McDonnell Douglas MD-90 (stretched and modernized version of the MD-80)
MD-95 (latest evolution of the DC-9, sold as Boeing 717)

Experimental aircraft
McDonnell Douglas X-36

Proposed airliners
McDonnell Douglas MD-12, a double-decker airplane similar to the Airbus A380 and Boeing NLA.
McDonnell Douglas MD-94X

Helicopters
AH-64 Apache (started under Hughes Helicopters)
MD 500 series (started under Hughes Helicopters)
MD 600
MD 901/902/902 Explorer

Spacecraft
Barbarian
Big Gemini
Skylab space station
Skylab B

Computer systems
McDonnell Douglas acquired Microdata Corporation in 1983. The division was spun out as a separate company, McDonnell Douglas Information Systems in 1993.

Sequel
Spirit
Reality OS
Series 18 Model 6
Series 18 Model 9
Sovereign
6200
6400
7000
9000
9200
9400

The corporation also produced the Sovereign (later M7000) series of systems in the UK, which used the Sovereign operating system developed in the UK and which was not based on Pick, unlike the "Reality" family of systems listed above. Sovereign, largely a Data Entry solution, had a reasonable market in the United States supporting data entry shops.

Missiles and rockets
BGM-109 Tomahawk missile
Harpoon missile
LIM-49 Spartan
M47 Dragon
Delta II rocket
Saturn S-IV second stage
Saturn S-IVB third stage
McDonnell Douglas DC-X reusable rocket

Commercial deliveries

Key people 
 James Smith McDonnell
 John McDonnell (businessman)
 Sanford N. McDonnell
 Harry Stonecipher

Footnotes

References 

 Yenne, Bill. McDonnell Douglas. Crescent Books, 1985. .

Further reading 

 Francillon, René J. McDonnell Douglas aircraft since 1920. Naval Institute Press, 1990. 2 volume set. 
 Greider, William. One World, Ready or Not. Penguin Press, 1997. .

External links 

 Official McDonnell Douglas site as archived at the Wayback Machine
 McDonnell Douglas Technical Services Company as archived at the Wayback Machine
 History of McDonnell Douglas on Boeing.com

 
 01
Aircraft manufacturers of the United States
Aerospace companies of the United States
Defense companies of the United States
Manufacturing companies based in California
Companies based in Long Beach, California
Companies based in St. Louis County, Missouri
American companies established in 1967
Manufacturing companies established in 1967
Technology companies established in 1967
1967 establishments in California
1967 establishments in Missouri
1997 disestablishments in Missouri
American companies disestablished in 1997
Manufacturing companies disestablished in 1997
Technology companies disestablished in 1997
Boeing mergers and acquisitions
Defunct aircraft manufacturers of the United States
Defunct helicopter manufacturers of the United States
Berkeley, Missouri
Collier Trophy recipients
History of Long Beach, California
1997 mergers and acquisitions